The 1951 season was the Chicago Bears' 32nd in the National Football League.  The team failed to improve on their 9–3 record from 1950 and finished at 7–5 under head coach and owner George Halas, fourth in the NFL's National Conference, but only a game behind winner Los Angeles, the eventual league champion.  This season was a drop off from the previous season's  tiebreaker playoff appearance.

The Bears lost twice to the crosstown Cardinals, who won just three games. The season finale was played in frigid conditions at Wrigley Field and cost the Bears a share of the conference title.

Regular season

Schedule

Game summaries

Week 1

Standings

References

 

Chicago Bears
Chicago Bears seasons
1951 in sports in Illinois